A Christmas Carol is a 1908 silent film produced by Essanay Studios in Chicago, and the first American film adaptation of Charles Dickens' famous 1843 novella of the same name. Tom Ricketts stars as Ebenezer Scrooge in the film, which is considered lost.

Plot
No prints of the first American film adaptation of A Christmas Carol are known to exist, but The Moving Picture World magazine provided a scene-by-scene description before the film's release. Scrooge goes into his office and begins working. His nephew, along with three women who wish for Scrooge to donate enter. However, Scrooge dismisses them.  On the night of Christmas Eve, his long-dead partner Jacob Marley comes as a ghost, warning him of a horrible fate if he does not change his ways.  Scrooge meets three spirits that show Scrooge the real meaning of Christmas, along with his grave, the result of his parsimonious ways. The next morning, he wakes and realizes the error of his ways. Scrooge was then euphoric and generous for the rest of his life.

Cast
 Thomas Ricketts as Ebenezer Scrooge

Production
A Christmas Carol was produced by the Essanay Film Manufacturing Company and released December 9, 1908.

Reception
"It is impossible to praise this film too highly", wrote The Moving Picture World magazine. "It reproduces the story as closely as it is possible to do in a film and the technical excellence of the work cannot be questioned. The photography, the staging and the acting are all of the best, and the story told is always impressive. … Such films cannot be too highly commended. They are a welcome relief from the riot of bloodshed which has marred the moving picture shows of New York and other cities far too long. Even though it costs a fortune almost to prepare such a film, it is quite likely that the public will patronize it sufficiently to make good the extraordinary outlay."

See also
 List of Christmas films
 List of ghost films
 List of American films of 1908
 List of A Christmas Carol adaptations

References

External links
 

1908 films
1908 lost films
1908 short films
1900s ghost films
American Christmas films
American black-and-white films
Films based on A Christmas Carol
Films set in the 1840s
American silent short films
Essanay Studios films
Lost American films
1900s Christmas films
1900s American films
Silent horror films
1900s English-language films
Silent American fantasy films